These are the full results of the 1989 IAAF World Cup which was held on 8–10 September 1989 at the Estadi Olímpic Lluís Companys in Barcelona, Spain.

Results

100 m

200 m

400 m

800 m

1500 m

5000/3000 m

10,000 m

110/100 m hurdles

400 m hurdles

3000 m steeplechase

Men
9 September

4 × 100 m relay

4 × 400 m relay

High jump

Pole vault

Men
9 September

Long jump

Triple jump

Men
9 September

Shot put

Discus throw

Hammer throw

Men
9 September

Javelin throw

Notes

AOriginal winner Perec was disqualified for a lane infringement.
BViolation on second exchange.

References

Competition results
Full results
Full Results by IAAF (archived)

IAAF World Cup results
Events at the IAAF Continental Cups